Alice is a 2022 American crime thriller film set in the 1970s, written and directed by Krystin Ver Linden, in her directorial debut. The film stars Keke Palmer, Jonny Lee Miller, Common, Gaius Charles, and Alicia Witt.

Alice had its world premiere at the 2022 Sundance Film Festival on January 23, 2022, and was released in the United States on March 18, 2022, by Roadside Attractions and Vertical Entertainment. The film received mixed reviews from critics. It was nominated in three categories for the NAACP Image Awards, and nominated for the Saturn Award for best independent film.

Plot 
Alice is enslaved on a 19th-century style plantation in Georgia, owned by Paul Bennet. Attempting to escape, she runs through a vast forest and emerges onto a Georgia highway in 1973. She meets Frank, a truck driver who helps her adjust to the truth of the time period, and that she has been misled her whole life. After reading some books explaining when and how all other plantations ended, and tracking down Rachel, the ex-wife of her "owner", she is able to convince Frank about the plantation. Inspired by Pam Grier's character in the film Coffy, she persuades Frank to go back with her, so that she can exact revenge on Bennet and free the rest of the "domestics" being held there.

Cast
 Keke Palmer as Alice
 Jonny Lee Miller as Paul Bennett
 Common as Frank
 Gaius Charles as Joseph
 Natasha Yvette Williams as Ruth
 Alicia Witt as Rachel
 Madelon Curtis as Mrs Bennett 
 Jaxon Goldenberg as Daniel Bennett
 Kenneth Farmer as Moses 
 Natasha Williams as Ruth
 Craig Stark as Aaron

Production
In September 2019, it was announced Krystin Ver Linden would direct and write the film. The publicity for the film states that it is "inspired by the true events of a woman of servitude in 1800s Georgia, who escapes the 55-acre confines of her captor to discover the shocking reality that exists beyond the tree line ... it's 1973." Elements of the film's background are loosely based on the narrative of Mae Louise Miller, who escaped from slavery in the 1960s.

In June 2020, Keke Palmer, Common, Jonny Lee Miller, and Sinqua Walls joined the cast of the film, with Palmer also serving as an executive producer. In November 2020, Gaius Charles and Alicia Witt joined the cast of the film.

Principal photography began in October 2020 in Savannah, Georgia.

Release
It had its premiere at the 2022 Sundance Film Festival on January 23, 2022. Prior to, Roadside Attractions and Vertical Entertainment acquired distribution rights to the film.

Reception

Box office
In the United States and Canada, the film earned $173,624 from 169 theaters in its opening weekend.

Critical response
On the review aggregator website Rotten Tomatoes, 29% of 70 critics' reviews are positive, with an average rating of 4.8/10. The website's consensus reads, "Alice's well-intentioned attempt to reckon with racism sadly misses the mark on multiple levels, although Keke Palmer's performance remains a consistent bright spot." Metacritic, which uses a weighted average, assigned the film a score of 47 out of 100, based on 19 critics, indicating "mixed or average reviews".

Accolades

References

External links
 

2022 films
2022 directorial debut films
2022 crime thriller films
2022 independent films
American crime thriller films
Blaxploitation films
Films about American slavery
Films set in 1973
Films set in Georgia (U.S. state)
Films shot in Savannah, Georgia
2020s English-language films
2020s American films